Damián J. Fernández is an American academic administrator and political scientist who served as the fifth president of Eckerd College. Fernández assumed office on July 1, 2020, succeeding Donald R. Eastman III and resigned on August 1, 2022.

Early life and education 
Fernández was born in Cuba and immigrated to Puerto Rico as a child. He earned a Bachelor of Arts in international relations with a minor in Latin American studies from the Princeton School of Public and International Affairs. He later earned a Master of Arts in Latin American studies from the University of Florida and PhD in international relations from the University of Miami.

Career 
Fernández began his career as a high school educator at Phillips Academy. He later worked as an instructor at Colorado College and associate dean at St. Thomas University. Fernández served as vice president for academic affairs at the State University of New York at Purchase and vice provost at Florida International University. Fernández served as CEO and head of school of Ethical Culture Fieldston School. From 2016 to 2020, Fernández served as chancellor of the Penn State Abington. He assumed office as president of Eckerd College on July 1, 2020, succeeding Donald R. Eastman III.

As an academic, Fernández's research focuses on international relations and Cuban politics.

References 

Presidents of Eckerd College
Eckerd College faculty
Princeton School of Public and International Affairs alumni
University of Miami alumni
University of Florida alumni
State University of New York at Purchase faculty
Colorado College faculty
St. Thomas University (Florida) faculty
Florida International University faculty
Pennsylvania State University faculty
Living people
American academic administrators
American political scientists
Year of birth missing (living people)